Ellesmere is a rural locality in the South Burnett Region, Queensland, Australia. In the  Ellesmere had a population of 343 people.

History 
Ellesmere State School opened in May 1916. It closed in 1922, but reopened on 16 July 1923. In 1961 it closed permanently.

In the  Ellesmere had a population of 343 people.

References 

South Burnett Region
Localities in Queensland